Konrad Juszczyszyn (born 28 November 1993) is a Polish professional pool player. Juszczyszyn won the 9-Ball event at the 2018 European Pool Championship. Juszczyszyn is also a runner-up on the Euro Tour, reaching the final of the 2015 German Open, losing in the final to Petri Makkonen 3–9. Juszczyszyn later won the 2019 Treviso Open, defeating Ivar Saris in the final 6–9.

Titles & achievements
 American Straight Pool Championship  (2017)
 Euro Tour
 Treviso Open (2019)
 European Pool Championship
 Nine-Ball (2018)
 Polish Pool Championship
 Nine-Ball (2015, 2016)
 Polish Amateur Snooker Championship (2021)

References

External links

Living people
Polish sportsmen
Polish pool players
1993 births
20th-century Polish people
21st-century Polish people